Georg is a 2007 biography drama film about Estonian singer Georg Ots. It was directed by Peeter Simm and written by Mati Põldre and Alexander Borodyansky.  They used interview material from Georg Ots' second wife Asta Ots. The film stars prominent Estonian actor Marko Matvere, Russian actress Anastasiya Makeyeva and Latvian singer Renārs Kaupers.

The film was released in Estonia on 5 October 2007. Georg was made together by Estonia, Russia and Finland and it runs approximately 105 minutes. The budget was 32 million kroons, which at the time was the highest for an Estonian film ever. Georg was shot on location in Tallinn, Helsinki and Moscow.

Cast
Marko Matvere as Georg Ots
Anastasiya Makeyeva as Asta Ots
Renārs Kaupers as Caesar
Elle Kull as Lydia Ots
Tõnu Kark as Karl Ots
Mirtel Pohla as Margot
Karin Touart as Ilona
Rein Oja as Richard
Aleksander Okunev as Nikolaev
Sergey Fetissov as Nikita Khrushchev
Bert Raudsepp as painter
Indrek Taalmaa as Taleš
Hele Kõre as Asta Ots (voice)
Andero Ermel as Caesar (voice)

References

External links
 
 Georg official webpage

2007 films
Estonian drama films
Biographical films about singers
Films about classical music and musicians
Cultural depictions of classical musicians
Cultural depictions of Estonian people
Cultural depictions of Nikita Khrushchev
Films shot in Moscow